The Pinzirita or  Pinzunita is a breed of domestic sheep indigenous to the Mediterranean island of Sicily, Italy. Its name derives from pinzuni, the Sicilian language name for the chaffinch, Fringilla coelebs, which it is thought to resemble in colouring. It is also known as the Siciliana comune, or "common Sicilian sheep". It is distributed throughout most of Sicily, except for the southern coast, where the Comisana is preferred, and the hills of the provinces of Agrigento, Caltanissetta and the southern part of the province of Palermo, where the Barbaresca is predominant. Like the Leccese and Altamurana, it belongs to the Zackel sheep group. It is a hardy and frugal breed, well adapted to survival on poor mountain pasture and in the macchia mediterranea biome of inland Sicily.

The Pinzirita is one of the seventeen autochthonous Italian sheep breeds for which a genealogical herdbook is kept by the Associazione Nazionale della Pastorizia, the Italian national association of sheep-breeders.

The milk yield of the Pinzirita averages  litres in 100 days for primiparous ewes, and about  litres in 180 days for pluriparous ones. The milk has 6.4% fat and 5.0% protein. Lambs are usually slaughtered unweaned; at 30 days they weigh .

References

Sheep breeds originating in Italy